Anti-aircraft defences is an oil on canvas painting of 1940 by the British artist Christopher Nevinson in the collection of the Imperial War Museum. It depicts anti-aircraft batteries and London Blitz spotlights.  It was transferred to the museum in 1947 by the War Artists' Advisory Committee. Nevinson was hugely disappointed not to be offered a governmental commission for his work, and so this painting was created at a time of discord between him and Kenneth Clark.

References

1940 paintings
Paintings by Christopher R. W. Nevinson
Paintings in the collection of the Imperial War Museum